Kevin Carr (born 6 November 1958) is an English former professional footballer who played as a goalkeeper. Born in Morpeth, Carr began his career as an apprentice at Burnley. In total, Carr made over 200 appearances in the Football League for Newcastle United, Carlisle United, Darlington and Hartlepool United, before playing non-league football with Blyth Spartans.

External links

1958 births
Living people
English footballers
Burnley F.C. players
Newcastle United F.C. players
Carlisle United F.C. players
Darlington F.C. players
Hartlepool United F.C. players
Blyth Spartans A.F.C. players
English Football League players
Association football goalkeepers